Yakupovo (Yaqup) is a rural locality (a selo) in Yakshimbetovsky Selsoviet, Kuyurgazinsky District, Bashkortostan, Russia. The population was 322 as of 2010. There are 5 streets.

Geography 
Yakupovo is located 24 km southwest of Yermolayevo (the district's administrative centre) by road. Abdulovo is the nearest rural locality.

References 

Rural localities in Kuyurgazinsky District